Gilaneh is a 2004 film by Rakhshān Banietemad and Mohsen Abdulvahab. The film was nominated for three Crystal Simorghs at the Fajr Film Festival, which won Simorgh for Best Make-up and a Special Jury Prize, and Fatemeh Motamed-Arya, nominated for Crystal Simorgh for Best Actress.

Plot 
This film takes a look at the early days of the war and the deployment of young forces to the front. Naneh Gilaneh and her young son and daughter live a difficult life during the war and the bombing of Tehran.

Cast 
 Fatemeh Motamed-Arya as Gilaneh
 Bahram Radan as Esmail
 Baran Kosari as Maygol
 Zhaleh Sameti as Atefeh
 Shahrokh Foroutanian as Dr. Dabiri
 Majid Bahrami as The Soldier
 Nireh Farahani	
 Niloufar Khosh Kholgh	
 Mehdi Daneshraftar	
 Amirhosein Ghodsi

Awards 

 Jury commendation plaque;  Best Director;  Rakhshan Bani-Etemad;  7th Canary Islands International Film Festival;  Competition section;  2006
 Special Jury Prize;  Best Director;  Rakhshan Bani-Etemad;  10th Holy Defense Festival;  Feature Film Competition Section;  2005
 Special Award;  Best Actor;  Fatemeh Motamedaria;  10th Holy Defense Festival;  Feature Film Competition Section;  2005
 Pfeiffer Award;  Best Movie;  Saeed Saadi;  7th Sine Fan International Asian Film Festival;  Competition section;  2005
 Netpak Award;  Best Movie;  Saeed Saadi;  Twelfth International Asian Film Festival;  Competition section;  2005

References

External links 
 
 
 

2005 films
2000s Persian-language films
Iran–Iraq War films
Iranian war films